The men's javelin throw event at the 1983 Summer Universiade was held at the Commonwealth Stadium in Edmonton, Canada on 11 July 1983.

Results

References

Athletics at the 1983 Summer Universiade
1983